Truman "Mark" Herron (8 July 1928 – 13 January 1996) was an American actor and the fourth husband of singer and actress Judy Garland. They were married on November 14, 1965, in Las Vegas, Nevada, but they separated after five months of marriage. Seventeen months later, Garland was granted a divorce after testifying that Herron had beaten her. He said he had "only hit her in self-defense."

Herron appeared in films such as Federico Fellini's 8½ (1963), Girl in Gold Boots (1968) and Eye of the Cat (1969).

Gerald Clarke, in his biography of Garland, Get Happy, and in an interview about the book, reported that Herron had an affair with Tallulah Bankhead, prior to meeting Garland.

Garland put Herron to work as producer of her two London Palladium concerts with her daughter Liza Minnelli in 1964, as well as some appearances in Canada in 1965.

Aside from providing Gerold Frank information for his 1975 biography Judy, Herron remained silent on the topic of Garland. He continued acting, often appearing in summer stock productions.

Herron had a long-lasting relationship with fellow actor Henry Brandon, which was only briefly interrupted by his marriage to Garland. The two men remained together until Brandon's death in 1990.

Herron died of cancer in 1996, aged 67.

Filmography

References

External links

American male film actors
1928 births
1996 deaths
Bisexual male actors
Judy Garland
20th-century American male actors
People from Putnam County, Tennessee
Male actors from Tennessee
Deaths from cancer in California
LGBT people from Tennessee
American bisexual actors